Coleophora minimella is a moth of the family Coleophoridae. It is found in Algeria and Egypt.

The larvae feed on Kalidium, Halostachis and Halocnemum species. They feed on the assimilation shoots of their host plant.

References

minimella
Moths described in 1952
Moths of Africa